Hoër Volkskool Potchefstroom, also known as Volkies, is a public high school located in Potchefstroom, North West, South Africa.

Early History

The emergence of Christian National Education was closely linked with the rise of Afrikaner nationhood and resultant nationalism following the Second Anglo Boer War (1898/9 to 1902) and a number of "Volkskool" schools were established. These schools were often funded by Afrikaners from own funds and by the Reformist churches, despite the devastation of Boer resources during the Anglo-Boer War. These nascent establishments had to contend with the British government's parsimony and reluctance to allocate funding for Afrikaner education. This was due, in no small measure, to Lord Milner's antipathy to the Boer plight and his policy of anglicisation. Kitchener and Milner were at odds over the treatment of the Boers after the war. Kitchener was more lenient, he wanted to promote reconciliation between the white peoples of South Africa, while Milner wanted to exclude the Boers from future political power. Milner insisted that the Dutch language would no longer be treated on equal terms with English in government, the courts and in education. He wanted completely Anglicized colonies.  In 1875, a group of Afrikaans-speakers from the Cape formed the Genootskap vir Regte Afrikaanders ("Society for Real Afrikaners"), and published a number of books in Afrikaans including grammars, dictionaries, religious materials and histories.

Until the early 20th century, Afrikaans was considered a Dutch dialect, alongside Standard Dutch, which it eventually replaced as an official language. Before the Boer wars, "and indeed for some time afterwards, Afrikaans was regarded as inappropriate for educated discourse. Rather, Afrikaans was described derogatorily as 'a kitchen language' or 'a bastard jargon,' suitable for communication mainly between the Boers and their servants." The fledgling Afrikaans language gradually displaced Dutch as the Afrikaner mother tongue and the need for schools offering tuition in the language was a foregone conclusion. Milner's attempt to forcibly anglicise the Boers had failed. The Boers had responded by establishing their own schools. Afrikaans was recognised by the South African government as a distinct language, rather than simply a slang version of Dutch in 1925. Officially, Potchefstroom Volkskool thus predates the recognition of Afrikaans although the school offered Afrikaans medium education from inception.

It is in this context that the establishment of Potchefstroom Volkskool, like Heidelberg Volkskool and other Volkskool schools,  should be seen. On 19 April 1922 the Afrikaanse Medium Hoërskool opened inside a small church in Potchefstroom. Originally with only 38 standard six (now grade 8) students and three teachers: Mr J.D. Grundlingh and Mrs. Nellie Chessworth, the school's first acting principal was Mr. P.M. van der Lingen. It was on 11 October 1922 that Mr. J.C. Pauw became the school's first permanent principal. Mr. A.J.P. "Koos" Burger became its first permanent teacher a few months later. In early 1923, the school moved to a refurbished iron building, now with nearly 140 students ranging from standard seven to eight (now grades 9 and 10). The school's governing body decided to change the school's name to Hoër Volkskool Potchefstroom on the 30th of October, 1923. The school was built on grounds previously used as the Potchefstroom Agricultural Showground.

The cornerstone of the permanent school building, still in use to the present day, was laid on the 10th of June 1927 and it was put into use on 23 February the following year. Amongst the speakers at the official opening was then Administrator of the Transvaal, Jan H. Hofmeyr. In 1934  Mr Pauw was appointed as the Inspector of Education in the Transvaal, and Mr. C.H. Steyn took over as principal.

Colours and motto

The eagle on the badge symbolises victory. The three links in the chain symbolise unity, loyalty and good spirit. Koos Burger designed the badge. The school's colours were decided on in 1925 and consisted of black (inspired by Mr. Pauw's beloved jacket), gold (representing Potchefstroom's rich gold reserves) and wine red (burgundy) to form a harmony between them. The school's motto, Sapientia Vis Vera, means "Wisdom is true power" and was introduced along with the current badge in 1926. It was suggested by co-founder, Mr. Van der Lingen. In modern times, during the period of mr Swart's principalship, red was introduced as a school colour though the original burgundy still features in the school pinstripe tie.

The original common school blazer was a black pinstripe jacket with the school emblem on the breast pocket. The pinstripes were gold and burgundy. The current broad pinstripe blazer is worn by members of the first team in various sports. The original honours blazer was plain black with an embroidered emblem and the award embroidered above the emblem. Neither scrolls nor cords were worn, which is the current custom.

The school traditionally had a dress code for cultural events. This consisted of black trousers with white shirt for boys or long black skirts and white blouse for girls with the school blazer and tie. This was worn when representing the school at cultural events or when attending such events.

Sport

Cricket
Volkies has high quality cricket facilities, including indoor and outdoor nets and three cricket fields.

It engages in annual friendly matches against top cricketing schools including Jeppe High School for Boys, Afrikaanse Hoër Seunskool and Hoërskool Menlopark, as well as competing in the annual North West Super League competition. It enters a First XI and Second XI as well as an U/15A and U/15B team into these competitions. The first XI has won the Super League several times, including three times in a row since 2017, whereas the U/15A team has taken the title six consecutive times since 2014. As of 22 October 2019, the first XI sat 48th in the national rankings. The school's First XI was ranked at no 12 nationally in 2021 on 23 November 2021.

The school had achieved the "double" ( Administrator's Cup for rugby and cricket in the same year) thrice - in 1939,1961 and 1976. In 1983, the school won the Director's Trophy for rugby and reached the final in cricket, losing a tighly contested game against Randburg Hoër.

Rugby

Jack Pauw, who played flyhalf for Western Transvaal against the 1924 Lions, was the first rugby coach at the school which embraced the game from the start. The boys' boarding house is named after Mr Pauw. Notable coaches who'd had success with the first team were Mr Broekman and Mr " Oom Boet" Vorster. Between 1964 and 2004, the school has sent 188 players to Craven Week, six of whom were selected for the  SA Schools team.

The first win was 1939 when the 1st XV, captained by Josef Fürstenburg, won the Administrator’s Cup. Volkies has won the Administrator's/Director's/Beeld Trophy in 1939 (vs Hoërskool Monument), 1949 (Heidelberg Volkskool), 1950 (Heidelberg Volkskool), 1951 (Helpmekaar Hoërskool), 1961 ( shared with Rustenburg Hoërskool), 1976 (Nelspruit Hoërskool) and 1983 (Hoërskool Erasmus). The school also contested the final of the Cup in 1945 (vs Heidelberg Volkskool), 1965 (Ben Viljoen), 1969 (Die Fakkel) and 1970 (Afrikaanse Hoër Seunskool). The first team traditionally wears white trunks, whereas all the other teams wear black trunks. The school did not traditionally wear distinguishing first team jerseys, but since the advent of team sponsorship it does so now.

The very first rugby strip consisted of a white jersey with black trunks. After the school colours had been determined, the strip changed to a black jersey with gold collar and cuffs and a broad burgundy stripe over the chest and sleeves. In modern times, the colour red features prominent.

There have been four Old Boy Springboks – Nic Bierman, Daan du Plessis, Niek Bezuidenhout and Jorrie Muller. Jorrie Muller attended the school playing at scrumhalf in the 1996 First XV which won the Super 10 schools tournament, but actually matriculated from Monument Hoërskool and was selected for the 1999 South African Schools side and the victorious 2002 Junior Springbok side.

Notable alumni
 Roelof Frederik "Pik" Botha, DMS (27 April 1932 – 12 October 2018) was a South African politician who served as the country's  minister of Foreign Affairs and acting President on occasion. He succeeded Mr Hilgard Muller as Minister of Foreign Affairs and served as the ambassador to the United States.Botha began his career in the South African foreign service in 1953, serving in Sweden and West Germany. From 1963 to 1966, he served on the team representing South Africa at the International Court of Justice in The Hague in the matter of Ethiopia and Liberia v. South Africa, over the South African occupation of South-West Africa (now Namibia). 
 Hilgard Muller, DMS (4 May 1914 – 10 July 1985) was a South African politician of the National Party, Mayor of Pretoria in 1953–1955, elected an MP in 1958, appointed Minister of Foreign Affairs after the resignation of Eric Louw in 1964.
 Louis le Grange (16 August 1928 – 25 October 1991) was a lawyer, a South African politician, matriculated Potchefstroom Hoër Volkskool in 1946. He was a member of the National Party, Member of Parliament for the constituency of Potchefstroom (1966-1991), Deputy Minister of Information (1975-1978), Interior (1975-1978), Immigration (1978), and Public Works (1978), in the government of John Vorster. He then served as Minister of Tourism and Public Works (1978-1979), Prisons (1979-1980), Police (1979-1982) and Law and Order (1982-1986) in the cabinet of P.W. Botha, before he became the 13th Speaker of the House of Assembly of South Africa (1987-1991).
 Nic Bierman Lieutenant-General Jacobus Nicolas Bierman SSA SM CBE (1910–1977) was a South African military commander. He played  for the Springboks in 1931.He served as Army Chief of Staff from 1958 to 1959.
 Louis Vorster (2 November 1966 – 17 April 2012) was a South African-Namibian cricketer. Played at flyhalf in the 1983 Director's Trophy rugby union winning team against Hoërskool Erasmus. Played first class cricket , representing Transvaal, Western Transvaal, Northern Transvaal and at county level in England.
 Eugène Ney Terre'Blanche, (31 January 1941 – 3 April 2010) was an Afrikaner nationalist, former police officer and political figure who founded and led the Afrikaner Weerstandsbeweging (AWB). Terre'Blanche attended Laerskool Ventersdorp and Hoër Volkskool in Potchefstroom, matriculating in 1962. While in school, he gave early expression to his political leanings by founding the cultural organisation Jong Afrikanerharte (Young Afrikaner Hearts)
 James Hubert Kingston(born 30 November 1965, Ottosdal, South Africa), a South African professional golfer on the Asian and European Golf tours. In 2007 he finished top of the Order of Merit on the Sunshine Tour. Former World Top 100  golfer.

References 

High schools in South Africa
Schools in North West (South African province)
Potchefstroom